The 2012–13 Oregon State Beavers men's basketball team represented Oregon State University in the 2012–13 NCAA Division I men's basketball season. Head coach Craig Robinson was in his fifth year with the team. The Beavers played their home games at Gill Coliseum in Corvallis, Oregon and were a member of the Pac-12 Conference. They finish with a record of 14–18 overall, 4–14 in Pac-12 to finish in a last place tie with Washington State. They lost in the first round of the Pac-12 tournament to Colorado.

2012 recruiting class

Roster

Schedule 

|-
!colspan=9| Exhibition

|-
!colspan=9| Regular season

|-
!colspan=9| Pac-12 tournament

References

Oregon State Beavers men's basketball seasons
Oregon State
Oregon State
Oregon State